National Olympic and Paralympic Academy of Iran is a sporting academy situated in Tehran, Iran. It concerns the matters related to the Olympics and Paralympics.

See also
National Olympic Committee of Iran

External links
Website of National Olympic Academy of Iran

Sports governing bodies in Iran
Olympic Academy